"Find You" is a song by Russian-German musician and producer Zedd from the soundtrack to the film Divergent. It was released as the first single from the soundtrack on 26 January 2014.

The song features vocals from Swedish singer Miriam Bryant and American pop singer Matthew Koma, and was written by all three artists alongside Victor Radstrom, a frequent collaborator of Bryant. A lyric video was released on 30 January 2014.

Composition
The song is written in the key of E major, with a tempo of 128 beats per minute and a vocal range from E♭4 to E♭5.

Music video
The music video for "Find You" was uploaded to YouTube on 16 March 2014. The video has approximately 57,286,024 views as of 25 September 2022.

Track listing

Charts

Weekly charts

Year-end charts

See also
 List of number-one dance singles of 2014 (U.S.)

References

Zedd songs
2014 songs
2014 singles
Universal Music Group singles
Songs written for films
The Divergent Series